The third season of Lucha Underground, a lucha libre or professional wrestling television show, began on September 7, 2016. The third season, just like the first and second was broadcast on the El Rey Network in the United States. The producers of Lucha Underground announced the season debut of the third season on July 29, 2016 just over a week after Ultima Lucha Dos, the last episode of season two had aired on the El Rey Network. All wrestling matches for the show were filmed at the Lucha Underground Temple" set in Boyle Heights, Los Angeles, California between March and June, 2016. This season includes 40 episodes, more than either of the previous seasons, therefore pushing Lucha Underground to a total of 105 episodes. Season three will follow the pattern of the first two seasons and generally air as one hour shows, first run on Wednesday nights at 8 PM Eastern Time.

The Lucha Underground show is a lucha libre serial drama television series that combines traditional professional wrestling matches with fictional storylines and effects. Season three will follow up on the events of season two, especially storylines left unresolved at the end of Ultima Lucha Dos. The announcement of season 3 featured the Cero Miedo ("No Fear") hand gesture of Lucha Underground performer Pentagón Dark.

Cast and crew

Episodes

References

External links
 Official website
 MGM webpage for Lucha Underground

2016 American television seasons
2017 American television seasons
Lucha Underground